Hiromi may refer to:

Hiromi, Ehime, city in Shikoku, Japan
Hiromi (given name), unisex Japanese given name (including a list of persons with the name)
Hiromi (comedian), Japanese comedian
Hiromi (model), Japanese fashion model
Meitetsu Hiromi Line, railway in Japan
"Hiromi" (song), 2007 single by Jun Shibata
Hiromi Uehara, Japanese pianist

See also
Hiroomi, a masculine Japanese given name